Lincolnshire Independents is a British political party based in the county of Lincolnshire. They were founded in July 2008.

Local Government
At the 2009 election, Lincolnshire Independents stood 19 candidates for Lincolnshire County Council of whom four were elected.

Four years later, they increased their representation to nine seats and polled 10.4% of the votes cast county-wide.

In the 2016 England and Wales police and crime commissioner elections the party stood a candidate for the Lincolnshire area, attaining 18,497 votes or approximately 16.52% of the vote.

At the 2017 county council election the party lost all but one of their seats on Lincolnshire County Council. Party leader Marianne Overton MBE won the Bassingham & Welbourn division.

Marianne Overton has been the Independent Group leader and a vice-chair on the Local Government Association since 2011.

Parliamentary elections
At the 2010 general election, party leader Marianne Overton stood for Sleaford & North Hykeham. and retained her deposit by gaining more than 5% of the vote: She came fourth with 3,806 votes (6.4%). Campaign director Mark Horn, a Conservative Party member for 23 years who resigned as a county councillor in 2008, stood in Grantham and Stamford, receiving 929 votes (1.8%). In Louth and Horncastle, Daniel Simpson gained 576 votes (1.1%).

At the 2015 general election, Overton stood again in Sleaford & North Hykeham, coming fifth with 3,233 votes (5.2%). Jan Hansen stood in Grantham and Stamford, receiving 724 votes (1.3%) and Simpson stood again in Louth and Horncastle, polling 659 votes (1.3%). Additionally, Chris Darcel stood in Gainsborough, where he polled 505 votes (1%), and Helen Powell stood in Lincoln, where she received 286 votes (0.6%).

Overton stood in Sleaford and North Hykeham for a third time in the December 2016 by-election. She came fifth, with 2,892 votes (8.8%).

See also
 Boston Bypass Independents

References

External links
Lincolnshire Independents homepage
Mark Horn's campaign site
Election leaflets on The Straight Choice

Political parties established in 2008
Locally based political parties in England
Politics of Lincolnshire
2008 establishments in England